Court costs (also called law costs in English procedure) are the costs of handling a case, which, depending on legal rules, may or may not include the costs of the various parties in a lawsuit in addition to the costs of the court itself. In the United States, "court costs" (such as filing fees, copying and postage) are differentiated from attorney's fees, which are the hourly rates paid to attorneys for their work in a case. Court costs can reach very high amounts, often far beyond the actual monetary worth of a case. Cases are known in which one party won the case, but lost more than the monetary worth in court costs. Court costs may be awarded to one or both parties in a lawsuit, or they may be waived.

In the United Kingdom, Australia and Canada, the losing side is usually ordered to pay the winning side's costs. This acts as a significant disincentive to bringing forward court cases. Usually, the winning party is not able to recover from the losing party the full amount of their own solicitor's (attorney's) costs, and has to pay the shortfall out of pocket. The loser pays principle does not generally apply under the United States legal system.

United States
The loser pays principle does not apply under the United States legal system unless there is a specific statute awarding fees to the prevailing party. Alternatively, the contract between the parties may provide that the prevailing party is entitled to recover attorney's fees from the losing party. In cases in the federal court system, Title 28, section 1920, of the United States Code provides:

A judge or clerk of any court of the United States may tax as costs the following:
(1) Fees of the clerk and marshal;
(2) Fees for printed or electronically recorded transcripts necessarily obtained for use in the case;
(3) Fees and disbursements for printing and witnesses;
(4) Fees for exemplification and the costs of making copies of any materials where the copies are necessarily obtained for use in the case;
(5) Docket fees under section 1923 of this title;
(6) Compensation of court appointed experts, compensation of interpreters, and salaries, fees, expenses, and costs of special interpretation services under section 1828 of this title.
A bill of costs shall be filed in the case and, upon allowance, included in the judgment or decree.A 2022 study, which used a randomized controlled trial of court-related fee relief for misdemeanor defendants in an Oklahoma county, found that court fees neither caused nor deterred new crime, and did not provide meaningful financial benefit to the government.

Court costs by U.S. jurisdiction

See also
Criminal justice financial obligations

References

External links

Court fees - quick guide (Directgov, England and Wales)

Civil procedure
Legal costs

fr:Procédure civile en France#Les frais de justice